CombineZ is Free software image processing software package for creating extended depth of field images. It runs on Microsoft Windows. The current release is CombineZP (CombineZ-Pyramid), successor to CombineZM (CombineZ-Movie) which was based on CombineZ5 (designed for older versions of Windows and is no longer maintained).

CombineZ processes a stack of images (or "Frames") and is most frequently used to blend the focused areas of several partially focused digital photographs in order to create a composite image with an extended depth of field (DOF), created from the in-focus areas of each image.

Other uses 
CombineZ has many image manipulation functions that can be used in modifying images (frames) or sets of sequential images (stacks).  It can take videos and split them into individual frames which are then manipulated as a stack.  For instance, since version CombineZM one can take a movie through a microscope as you wind the focus up or down, and use it for focus stacking.  Alternatively, one can convert a sequence of static frames into a movie (including generating intermediate transitional frames for smoothness) or a pseudo-3D 'rocker' image stack animation.

Limitations 
 Does not support 16 bit images
 Images must be in height order (closest to furthest, but can be flipped within the application)
 Supports a limited number of image and video formats
 Only runs on Microsoft Windows

Gallery 

Some images created with CombineZP and taken with a Nikon Coolpix P7000:

Some images created with CombineZM/CombineZP and taken with a Nikon D300 with a macro lens:

References

External links

  
 
 Easy to read explanation of how CombineZM works
 Page with source code archives

Digital photography
Free photo software
Windows-only free software
Free graphics software
Articles containing video clips